Barton is a hamlet in the civil parish of Barton and Pooley Bridge, in  Eden District, Cumbria, England. The parish, which includes Barton and the larger settlement of Pooley Bridge, was renamed from "Barton" to "Barton and Pooley Bridge" on 1 April 2019, and had a population of 238 at the 2011 Census.

Etymology
Whaley suggests that 'Barton' is 'the barley farm or outlying grange', from OE 'beretūn' or, more probably, 'bærtūn', which was used of farms, especially outliers of large estates, used for storing crops." OE=Old English.

Buildings
St Michael's Church is a grade I listed building;  Glebe Farmhouse and Barton Church Farmhouse are grade II* listed, with a range of farm buildings attached to Barton Church Farmhouse listed at grade II. Several monuments in the church yard are individually listed at grade II.

See also

 Listed buildings in Barton and Pooley Bridge

References

External links

   Cumbria County History Trust: Barton (nb: provisional research only - see Talk page) 

Hamlets in Cumbria
Eden District